Gramella bathymodioli is a Gram-negative, rod-shaped, strictly aerobic and motile bacterium from the genus of Gramella which has been isolated from a mussel from the Tangyin hydrothermal field.

References

Flavobacteria
Bacteria described in 2020